The 2005–06 Tunisian Ligue Professionnelle 1 season was the 80th season of top-tier football in Tunisia.

Teams

AS Marsa
Club Africain
CA Bizertin
CS Hammam-Lif
CS Sfaxien
EGS Gafsa
Espérance de Tunis
ES Zarzis
EO Goulette et Kram
Etoile du Sahel
Jendouba Sport
JS Kairouan
Stade Tunisien
US Monastir

Results

League table

Result table

Leaders

References
2005–06 Ligue 1 on RSSSF.com

Tunisian Ligue Professionnelle 1 seasons
1
Tun